Banksia recurvistylis is a species of shrub that is endemic to a restricted area of Western Australia. It has densely crowded, deeply serrated pinnate leaves, the lobes very narrow triangular, and heads of between twenty-five and forty pale yellow flowers.

Description
The plant has a single stem at its base and does not form a lignotuber. The flowers are arranged in heads of between twenty-five and forty on short side branches.

Taxonomy and naming
Banksia recurvistylis was first formally described in 2009 by Kevin Thiele in the journal Nuytsia from specimens collected by Fred Hort in 2008 near Wandering. The specific epithet (recurvistylis) is derived from the Latin words recurvus meaning "curved backwards" and stylus meaning "style", referring to the styles of older flowers.

Distribution and habitat
This banksia grows in or near heath in shallow soil near granite outcrops. It is only known from five populations in the Monadnocks Conservation Park and Wandering Conservation Park.

Conservation status
Banksia recurvistylis is classified as "Priority Two" by the Western Australian Government Department of Parks and Wildlife meaning that it is poorly known and from only one or a few locations.

References

prolata
Plants described in 2009
Rosids of Western Australia